Varsity may refer to:

University, an institution of higher (or tertiary) education and research which awards academic degrees in various academic disciplines

Places
Varsity, Calgary, a neighbourhood in Calgary, Alberta, Canada
 Varsity Lakes, Queensland, a suburb of the Gold Coast, Queensland, Australia

Books and publications
Varsity (Cambridge), a student newspaper at Cambridge University
Varsity (Cape Town), a student newspaper of the University of Cape Town
The Varsity (newspaper), a student newspaper at the University of Toronto

Business
The Varsity (restaurant), a drive-in restaurant in Atlanta, Georgia, US
Varsity (pub chain), a UK pub chain

Media
 The Boys Presents: Varsity, a 2023 live-action adaptation of The Boys comic book series arc "We Gotta Go Now"
 Varsity (band), an indie rock band from Chicago 
 "Varsity" (alma mater song), the alma mater song of the University of Wisconsin-Madison
 "Varsity" (fight song), a 1911 fight song of the University of Michigan
 Varsity, a 2014 EP by ASTR
 Varsity (film), a lost 1928 American comedy silent film
 Varsity (group), a South Korean boy group formed by CSO Entertainment in 2017

Sports
Varsity Cup Championship, an American college rugby competition
Varsity team, the principal athletic teams representing a North American college or university, high school, or middle school
Varsity match, a sports fixture played between traditional rival universities
Varsity (rowing regatta), a student rowing regatta in the Netherlands
Toronto Varsity Blues, varsity teams of the University of Toronto
Varsity Arena, the Varsity Blues' hockey arena
Varsity Stadium, the Varsity Blues' football stadium
Varsity Rugby, South African rugby union competitions
Varsity Sports (South Africa), university sports league
Varsity Hockey (South Africa)
Varsity Football (South Africa)
Varsity FC, a Canadian soccer team

Transport
Varsity (train), a passenger train of the Chicago, Milwaukee, St. Paul & Pacific Railroad, a.k.a., the Milwaukee Road
Varsity Line, the railway line that formerly connected Oxford and Cambridge
Vickers Varsity, a post-World War II military trainer aircraft based on the Vickers Viking

Other uses
Operation Varsity, an airborne operation in World War II
Varsity Scouting, a program of the Boy Scouts of America for older boys
Varsity TV, a former teen-oriented television network
The Varsity (West Lafayette, Indiana), an apartment building
 Varsity College (South Africa), a school

See also

 Junior Varsity (disambiguation)
 
 
 University (disambiguation)